Patrick T. Price (died 1890) was a state legislator in Arkansas. He represented Lee County, Arkansas in the Arkansas House of Representatives in 1877 as a Republican. His fellow Lee County representative was Crockett Brown.

His seat was contested by a Mr Wood, but the house resolved that the Price was entitled to the seat. The report of this in the newspaper refers to him as Patrick L. Price.

He was born sometime from 1845 to 1847 and died in 1890.
He was also a reverend.

See also
 African-American officeholders during and following the Reconstruction era

References

Republican Party members of the Arkansas House of Representatives
1840s births
1890 deaths
African-American state legislators in Arkansas
African-American politicians during the Reconstruction Era
People from Lee County, Arkansas